Friday Night in America is the ninth and final studio album by progressive bluegrass band New Grass Revival, released in 1989. The album includes the single "Callin' Baton Rouge", the band's only Top 40 hit on Hot Country Songs. Both it and "Do What You Gotta Do" were later released as singles by Garth Brooks: the former in 1993 from his album In Pieces, and the latter in 2000 from his album Sevens.

Track listing

Personnel
 Sam Bush - fiddle, mandolin, guitar, vocals
 John Cowan - bass guitar, vocals
 Béla Fleck - banjo, vocals
 Pat Flynn - guitar, vocals

Additional musicians and staff
 Eddie Bayers - drums
 Garth Fundis - backing vocals, producer
 Caroline Greyshock - photography
 Bob Mater - drums
 Denny Purcell - mastering engineer
 Gary Laney - recording engineer, mixing
 Tom Roady - percussion
 Wendy Waldman - backing vocals, producer

External links
 http://www.artistdirect.com/nad/store/artist/album/0,,138179,00.html

New Grass Revival albums
1989 albums
Capitol Records albums
Albums produced by Garth Fundis
Albums produced by Wendy Waldman